Coolidge is an unincorporated area in northern Alberta, Canada within Athabasca County.

See also 
List of communities in Alberta

References 

Localities in Athabasca County